Inglewood: Live in California is a live album by Deep Purple. It was recorded in Los Angeles on 18 October 1968, as the supporting band for Cream, at their Farewell Tour. One of the very few live recordings featuring the Mark I lineup, it was finally released in 2002 on Purple Records.

Notes on the source recording
The source of this recording is the mono audio track of a primitive open-reel video recording made by Purple's US label at the time, Tetragrammaton Records. The video recording was made from the audience with a (then) state-of-the-art Sony 1/2 inch reel-to-reel videotape recorder and portable camera, with an open air microphone to capture the sound. The black and white picture quality of the video was poor, but the audio was quite acceptable. When Warner Bros. Records took over Tetragrammaton's roster in 1970, the original half-inch video tape reel was discarded. It was rescued and after many years, and acquired by the fan organization The Deep Purple Appreciation Society. The audio portion was transferred and remastered for this CD release.

Track listing

Personnel
 Rod Evans: lead vocals
 Ritchie Blackmore: guitar
 Nick Simper: bass guitar, backing vocals
 Jon Lord: keyboards, backing vocals
 Ian Paice: drums, percussion

References

2002 live albums
Deep Purple live albums
Purple Records live albums
Albums recorded at the Forum